The onset of deconfinement refers to the beginning of the creation of deconfined states of strongly interacting matter produced in nucleus-nucleus collisions with increasing collision energy (a quark–gluon plasma).

The onset of deconfinement was predicted by Marek Gazdzicki and Mark I. Gorenstein to be located in the low energy range of the Super Proton Synchrotron (SPS) at the European Organization for Nuclear Research (CERN). These predictions have been confirmed by the NA49 experiment at the CERN SPS within the energy scan programme. The most famous of these is the "horn"  in the ratio of mean multiplicities of positively charged kaons and pions observed in collisions of two lead nuclei at the low energies of the SPS.

Strangeness production in relativistic heavy-ion collisions is used for the detection of the onset of deconfinement.

References

External links 
Description of the NA49 experiment

Quark matter